Betty Arvaniti (born 4 August 1939) is a Greek actress. She appeared in 40 films and television shows between 1965 and 2002.

Selected filmography
 Istoria mias zois (1965) as Mrs. Leondiadou
 Man for all the chores (1966) as mother
 Bullets don't come back (1967) as warden's mistress
 Imperiale (1968) as Zoi
 I Haravgi tis Nikis (1971) as Martha
 Thema syneidiseos (1973) as Mrs. Sakellaropoulou
 Who Pays the Ferryman? (TV-series, 1977) as Annika Zeferis
 The Dark Side of the Sun (TV-series, 1983) as Ismini Christoyannis

References

External links

1939 births
Living people
Greek film actresses
Actresses from Athens